California Plaza is a business office and commercial complex in the Bunker Hill District of downtown Los Angeles, California. It consists of two skyscrapers, One California Plaza and Two California Plaza. The plaza is also home to the Los Angeles Museum of Contemporary Art (MoCA), Colburn School of Performing Arts, the Los Angeles Omni Hotel, and an entertainment/park plaza.

One California Plaza
One California Plaza, 300 South Grand Avenue, Los Angeles

Two California Plaza
Two California Plaza, 350 South Grand Avenue, Los Angeles

Buildings and structures in Los Angeles
Bunker Hill, Los Angeles